Social change is the alteration of the social order of a society which may include changes in social institutions, social behaviours or social relations. Sustained at a larger scale, it may lead to social transformation or societal transformation.

Definition 
Social change may not refer to the notion of social progress or sociocultural evolution, the philosophical idea that society moves forward by evolutionary means. It may refer to a paradigmatic change in the socio-economic structure, for instance the transition from feudalism to capitalism, or hypothetical future transition to some form of post-capitalism.

Social development refers to how people develop social and emotional skills across the lifespan, with particular attention to childhood and adolescence. Healthy social development allows us to form positive relationships with family, friends, teachers, and other people in our lives.

Accordingly, it may also refer to social revolution, such as the Socialist revolution presented in Marxism, or to other social movements, such as women's suffrage or the civil rights movement. Social change may be driven through cultural, religious, economic, environmental, scientific or technological forces.

Prominent theories 

Change comes from two sources. One source is unique factors such as climate, weather, or the presence of specific groups of people. Another source is systematic factors. For example, successful development generally has the same requirements, such as a stable and flexible government, enough free and available resources, and a diverse social organization of society. On the whole, social change is usually a combination of systematic factors along with some random or unique factors.

Many theories attempt to explain social change. One view suggests that a theory of change should include elements such as structural aspects of change (like population shifts), processes and mechanisms of social change, and directions of change.
Christian: In Christianity & Judaism social change is seen in terms of God's blessings on faithfulness or curses on disobedience. See Deuteronomy chapter 28. 
 Hegelian: The classic Hegelian dialectic model of change is based on the interaction of opposing forces. Starting from a point of momentary stasis, Thesis countered by Antithesis first yields conflict, then it subsequently results in a new Synthesis.
 Marxist: Marxism presents a dialectical and materialist concept of history, seeing humankind's history as a fundamental "struggle between social classes".
 Kuhnian: The philosopher of science, Thomas Kuhn argues in The Structure of Scientific Revolutions with respect to the Copernican Revolution that people are likely to continue utilizing an apparently unworkable paradigm until a better paradigm is commonly accepted. A Kuhnian approach to the study of societies is provided by the critical juncture approach to social order and change.
 Heraclitan: The Greek philosopher Heraclitus used the metaphor of a river to speak of change thus: "On those stepping into rivers staying the same other and other waters flow" (DK22B12). What Heraclitus seems to be suggesting here, later interpretations notwithstanding, is that, in order for the river to remain the river, change must constantly be taking place. Thus one may think of the Heraclitan model as parallel to that of a living organism, which, in order to remain alive, must constantly change. A contemporary application of this approach is shown in the social-change theory SEED-SCALE which builds off of the complexity theory subfield of emergence.
 Daoist: The Chinese philosophical work Dao De Jing, I.8 and II.78 uses the metaphor of water as the ideal agent of change. Water, although soft and yielding, will eventually wear away stone. Change, in this model, is to be natural, harmonious and steady, albeit imperceptible.
Four Levels of Action: Will Grant of the Pachamama Alliance describes "Four Levels of Action" for change:

 individual
 friends and family
 community and institutions
 economy and policy

Grant suggests that individuals can have the largest personal impact by focusing on levels 2 and 3.

Types of change 
Social changes can vary according to speed and scope and impetus.
Some research on the various types of social change focuses on social organizations such as corporations.

Different manifestations of change include:

 Fabian change – gradual and reformist incremental amelioration after the manner of the Fabian Society
 radical change – improvements root and branch in the style of political radicalism
 revolutionary change – abrupt, radical and drastic change, with implications of violence and of starting afresh (perhaps most popular as a political bogeyman)
 transformational change – a New-age version of radical change, and thus difficult to define
 continuous change, open-ended change – change (allegedly) for the sake of change
 top-down change – reliance on leadership
 bottom-up change – reliance on the huddled masses
From a systems perspective, change in a system can be organized based on whether it is internally- or externally-driven and non-structural or structural. As a result, a living (ecological, social) system can undergo four types of change:

 internally-driven non-structural: regular dynamics in any living system
 externally-driven non-structural: acclimation or acclimatization
 internally-driven structural: mutation or innovation
 externally-driven structural: natural selection 

The last three types of change are also the only possible forms of adaptation.

Current examples

Global demographic shifts 

One of the most obvious changes currently occurring is the change in the relative global population distribution between countries. In recent decades, developing countries have become a larger proportion of the world population, increasing from 68% in 1950 to 82% in 2010, and the population of the developed countries has declined from 32% of the total world population in 1950 to 18% in 2010. China and India continue to be the largest countries, followed by the US as a distant third. However, population growth throughout the world is slowing. Population growth among developed countries has been slowing since the 1950s and is now at 0.3% annual growth. Population growth among the less developed countries excluding the least developed ones has also been slowing since 1960 and is now at 1.3% annually. Population growth among the least developed countries has slowed relatively little and is the highest at 2.7% annual growth.

Gendered patterns of work and care 
In much of the developed world, changes from distinct men's work and women's work to more gender equal patterns have been economically important since the mid-20th century. Both men and women are considered to be great contributors to social change worldwide.

See also 

 Accelerating change
 Activism
 Alternative movement
 Comparative historical research
 Constitutional economics
 Critical juncture theory
 Culture change
 Decadence
 Global Social Change Research Project
 Globalization
 Historical sociology
 Industrialisation
 Lifestyle (sociology)
 Modernization theory
 Reform movement
 Reformism
 Revolution
 Secularization
 Social conservatism
 Social degeneration
 Social development theory
 Social movement
 Social progress
 Social relation
 Social revolution
 Social transformation
 Societal collapse
 Societal transformation
 Sociocultural evolution

References

Further reading
 Eisenstadt, SN (1973). Tradition, Change, and Modernity. Krieger Publishing.
 Giddens, Anthony (2006). Sociology. Cambridge: Polity Press.
 Haralambos, Michael and Holborn, Martin (2008). Sociology: Themes and Perspectives. London: HarperCollins. 
 Harper, CL (1993). Exploring Social Change. New Jersey: Engelwood Cliffs.
 
Milstein, T. & Castro-Sotomayor, J.(2020). "Routledge Handbook of Ecocultural Identity." London, UK: Routledge. https://doi.org/10.4324/9781351068840.
Talcott Parsons, The Social System, (1951) New York: The Free Press
Polanyi, Karl. (1944). The Great Transformation. New York: Farrar & Rinehart.
 Tilly, Charles. (1988). "Misreading, then Rereading, Nineteenth-Century Social Change." Pp. 332–58 in Social Structures: A Network Approach, eds. Barry Wellman and S.D. Berkowitz. Cambridge: Cambridge University Press.
 Tilly, Charles. (2004). Social Movements, 1768-2004. Boulder, CO: Paradigm Publishers. .
 Vago, Steven. (1999). Social Change, 4th ed. Upper Saddle River, NJ: Prentice Hall. .

External links 

 Understanding The World Today – reports about global social, political, economic, demographic and technological change
 Social Change Collection from Georgia State University

 
Social movements